Thomas Hancock VC (July 1823 – 12 March 1871) was an English recipient of the Victoria Cross, the highest and most prestigious award for gallantry in the face of the enemy that can be awarded to British and Commonwealth forces.

Details
He was about 33 years old, and a private in the 9th Lancers (The Queen's Royal), British Army during the Indian Mutiny when the following deed took place on 19 June 1857 at Delhi, India for which he and John Purcell were awarded the VC:

In a later dispatch from Brigadier-General Hope Grant, C.B. to Major H. W. Norman, Assistant Adjutant-General of the Army, on 10 January 1858, Hope writes:

He later achieved the rank of corporal. He died in Westminster Workhouse, 12 March 1871, and was buried in a common (unmarked) grave in Brompton Cemetery.  A memorial stone was subsequently placed over the burial plot on 15 October 2011.

References

Location of grave (Brompton Cemetery)
Placing memorial stone

1823 births
1871 deaths
9th Queen's Royal Lancers soldiers
British recipients of the Victoria Cross
Burials at Brompton Cemetery
Indian Rebellion of 1857 recipients of the Victoria Cross
People from Kensington
English amputees
British Army recipients of the Victoria Cross
Military personnel from London